Mairéad Graham is a camogie player, winner of a Soaring Star award in 2010 and three All Ireland Intermediate championship medals in 2001, 2003 and 2011.

Other awards
Four Ulster Championship, two All Ireland Purcell Cups, two Purcell All Stars, three Minor Antrim Championships and Leagues.

References

External links
 Camogie.ie Official Camogie Association Website

Living people
Antrim camogie players
Year of birth missing (living people)